Otterburn Tower (sometimes spelled Otiburne; originally Otterburn Castle; currently Otterburn Tower Hotel) is a Grade II listed castellated, three star country house hotel in Otterburn, Northumberland. Founded by a cousin of William the Conqueror in 1086, it was later owned by the Clan Hall, before being rebuilt in 1830 by Thomas James, a magistrate, on the site and using some of the stones from the Otterburn Castle. Nearby Otterburn Hall was built in 1870 on land given to a Lord Douglas as recompense for the death of his ancestor Lord William Douglas in the Battle of Otterburn.

Geography
It is on the right bank of the River Rede within the Northumberland National Park, and is accessible by the A696 road along the Redesdale valley.

The tower is said to be "bosomed high in tufted trees". Several spots are marked with stones set in circles, indicating ancient places of burial. Otterburn Hall, a fortified country house hotel, Otterburn Mill, and a quarry are nearby.

History
Otterburn Tower was built on the site and using some of the stones from Otterburn Castle. Otterburn Castle, as it was originally known, was founded by a cousin of William the Conqueror in 1086 as a bastion to repel the Scots.

14th-16th centuries
In August 1388, during the Battle of Otterburn, initially, the Scottish forces had camped near the Redesdale valley close to the tower, in the evening. The next day, early in the morning, they attacked the Otterburn Tower but were unsuccessful in their attempt to capture it. Following this failure, the Scottish forces wanted to return to their homes but Douglas wanted to pursue the battle as Percy had vowed that he would not allow the Scots to leave the village Otterburn. The village then witnessed fierce battle between "the English and Scots, under the command of Henry Percy and Earl Douglas in which the former was taken prisoner and the latter was killed", on 19 August 1388. By the beginning of the 15th century, the tower was held by Sir Robert Umfraville. It was owned by Clan Hall from at least the 1500s.

18th-19th centuries
One of its notable owners was Mad Jack Hall, a Jacobite rebel who was tried five times and finally executed at Tyburn for high treason on 13 July 1716, and his initials are still carved over one of the original doors. He had pleaded during the trial that as he was returning from a Justice’s meeting, he was surrounded by rebels and forced to go with them. In 1777, the "Percy Cross" was placed near the tower to commemorate the Otterburn Battle site.

Thomas James built Otterburn Tower over what was Otterburn Castle incorporating the masonry of an 18th-century house which contained an early building. No traces of the castle remain.

William James of Otterburn Towers, a Lt. of 42nd Highlanders, served in the Crimea and Indian Mutiny on 28 Feb 1838 and 9 April 1864, respectively. He was the son of Thomas James.

20th Century
In 1938, Sir Archibald Woollaston White, 4th Baronet of Tuxford and Wallingwells bought the Otterburn Tower Estate. He and his family lived there for the bulk of The Second World War. Sir Archibald took command of the local Home Guard Battalion during the war and set about training and organising it. The decision to sell the estate was made in 1944 when the army's artillery range was extended further south, with the guns firing at longer range than was previously possible. The bulk of the estate was bought by the army for the firing ranges, which it remains today. Sir Archibald moved to the Torhousemuir Estate near Wigtown in Dumfries and Galloway.

Modern times
It became a Grade II listed building on 7 January 1988.

Architecture and fittings
Otterburn is a castellated building. Much of the current building was constructed in 1830 incorporating an 18th-century tower and earlier architectural work as little of the original tower remained. The northern corner of the modern tower includes part of the walls of the old castle. The building was extended at the rear in 1904, and a stable block was added by F.W. Rich for Howard Pease.

Grounds
Three Roman altar stones, said to have been brought from Rochester, are situated at the entrance to the tower. The Douglas Monument, within a small clump of trees, contains a large upright stone which was originally a fireplace beam in Otterburn Castle, which was in the process of being demolished around the time the Douglas Monument was created.

References

External links
 
 

Country houses in Northumberland
1086 establishments in England
Houses completed in 1830
Hotels in Northumberland
Otterburn, Northumberland
Castles in Northumberland
Buildings and structures completed in 1086
Country house hotels